Manulife Philippines (also known as The Manufacturers Life Insurance Co. (Phils.), Inc.) is a life insurance company in the Philippines and part of Manulife Financial Corporation, a Canadian life insurance company.

In 2002, Manulife acquired the Philippines business of Metropolitan Life Insurance Company, an insurer based in the United States.

References

External links

Financial services companies established in 1901
Life insurance companies of the Philippines
Companies listed on the Philippine Stock Exchange
Companies based in Makati
Philippine subsidiaries of foreign companies